Murray State University (MSU) is a public university in Murray, Kentucky. In addition to the main campus in Calloway County in southwestern Kentucky, Murray State operates extended campuses offering upper level and graduate courses in Paducah, Hopkinsville, Madisonville, and Henderson.

History
Murray State University was founded after passage of Senate Bill 14 by the General Assembly of the Commonwealth of Kentucky, which created two normal schools in the early 20th century to address the growing demand for professional teachers. One was to be located in the western part of the state, and many cities and towns bid for the new normal school. Rainey T. Wells spoke on behalf of the city of Murray to convince the Normal School Commission to choose his city. On September 2, 1922, Murray was chosen as the site of the western normal school, while Morehead was chosen for the eastern normal school. On November 26, 1922, John Wesley Carr was elected the first president of the Murray State Normal School by the State Board of Education. Believing it had the authority to elect the president, the Normal School Commission picked Rainey Wells as the first president. On May 15, 1923, the Kentucky Court of Appeals ruled for the State Board of Education, and Carr became Murray's first president.

Murray State Normal School opened on September 24, 1923. In 1924, the first building on Murray State's campus, the Administrative Building, was constructed. Prior to this, all MSU classes had been held on the first floor of what is now Murray Middle School, located on Main Street. Designed by Joseph & Joseph in the Collegiate Gothic style the Administrative Building, later known as Wrather Hall, housed classrooms, a dining hall, offices, and a chapel. The building was added to the National Register of Historic Places in 1975, and renovated soon after, finally being renamed to Wrather West Kentucky Museum, named for Murray State executive vice-president Marvin O. Wrather. All students lived at home or boarded with local families until the first dormitory, Wells Hall, was constructed in 1925. Wilson Hall was also completed under Carr's presidency, with other structures in progress.

In 1926, Rainey T. Wells, recognized as the founder of Murray State, became its second president. Wells served from 1926 to 1932, and during this time Lovett Auditorium, Carr Health Building, and Pogue Library were all completed. In 1926, the Normal School was renamed Murray State Normal School and Teachers College, with a four-year curriculum, and the General Assembly granted it authority to confer baccalaureate degrees. In 1928, the college was accredited by the Southern Association of Colleges and Schools. In 1930, the name was changed to Murray State Teachers College and it was granted authority to offer liberal arts and pre-professional courses. The name was changed again in 1948 to Murray State College, with expansion of the programs to include graduate-level courses, in 1966 the General Assembly authorized the Board of Regents to change the name to Murray State University.

The Shield

The Shield is the official seal of the university. It is taken from the heraldic coat of arms of the family of William Murray, Earl of Mansfield and Lord Chief Justice of Great Britain in 1756. William Murray is an ancestor of the Murray family from whom the city and the university take their names. The shield is blue with a double gold border—its three stars represent hope, endeavor and achievement.

Presidents
Presidents of the university include:
 John W. Carr, 1923–1926
 Rainey T. Wells, 1926–1932
 John W. Carr, 1933–1936
 James H. Richmond, 1936–1945
 Ralph H. Woods, 1945–1968
 Harry M. Sparks, 1968–1973
 Constantine W. Curris, 1973–1983
 Kala M. Stroup, 1983–1990
 James L. Booth, 1989–1990 (acting)
 Ronald J. Kurth, 1990–1994
 Samuel Kern Alexander, 1994–2001
 Fieldon King Alexander, 2001–2005
 Samuel Kern Alexander, 2006 (interim)
 Tim Miller, 2006 (interim)
 Randy J. Dunn, 2006–2013
 Tim Miller, 2013–2014
 Robert O. Davies, 2014–2018
 Robert Jackson, 2018–present

Campus

The Quad

The oldest and most easily recognizable buildings on the Murray State campus are situated around a large, grassy, tree-lined area on the south side of campus. This part of campus, known as the Quad, is bounded by 16th Street to the west, 15th Street to the east, Lovett Auditorium to the north and Wilson Hall to the south.

In the southwest corner of the Quad is the oldest building on campus, now known as Wrather West Kentucky Museum. It was first known as the Administration Building and then as Wrather Hall, and housed classrooms and offices, before it became a museum. Ground for Wrather was broken on October 15, 1923, and it has been in use since 1924. The building was placed on the National Register of Historic Places in 1975, and features a large auditorium that is frequently used for lectures and meetings.

Faculty Hall, Wells Hall and the Business Building line the western edge of the Quad. The Lowry Center, Pogue Library and the Price Doyle Fine Arts Center line the eastern side of the Quad. The 11-story Doyle Fine Arts Center is the tallest building on campus, housing numerous classrooms, practice rooms and recital halls, the Robert E. Johnson Theatre, Clara Eagle Art Gallery, WKMS-FM and television studios used for student work.

Directly south of the Quad is Sparks Hall. The five-story, 39,000-square-foot (3,600 m2), Sparks Hall was completed in 1967 at a cost of $1,308,514, and functions as the main administrative building, housing the offices of student financial aid, admissions and registration, accounting and financial services, vice president for administrative services, Center for Continuing Education and Academic Outreach, human resources and university communications.

To the south of the Quadrangle, and directly west of Sparks Hall is Oakhurst, the residence of the university president. Construction of the mansion, originally known as Edgewood, began in 1917 and was completed in 1918. The home was built by Dr. and Mrs. Rainey T. Wells. The Board of Regents purchased the home from Rainey T. Wells in June 1936. It was remodeled that year and renamed Oakhurst in preparation for James H. Richmond's occupation of the house.

Central campus
The central portion of the Murray State campus lines 15th Street between Chestnut Street and Olive Boulevard. This portion of 15th Street was originally open to automobile traffic, but has since been closed and converted into a pedestrian thoroughfare. Along the west side of the pedestrian pathway is the Martha Layne Collins Center for Industry and Technology, Blackburn Science Building, and Oakley Applied Science Building. To the east of the pedestrian pathway lies the Curris Center, Carr Health Building and Cutchin Fieldhouse, Waterfield Library, Mason Hall, and the front facade of the now-demolished Ordway Hall. Woods Hall, a former dormitory located behind Waterfield Library, was razed in summer 2019, and the space it occupied will soon be replaced with a park.

Ordway Hall was the most historic building in the central portion of campus. The contract for its construction was approved in April 1930, and it was completed in 1931 costing $106,765. Originally used as a men's dormitory, 38,600-square-foot Ordway Hall housed unique event space and several offices, including the Career Services and Student Affairs offices. Because of costly renovation needs, including upgrades to meet current fire protection and ADA requirements, Ordway Hall was razed in 2013. In recognition of the building's historical value to the campus, the front facade was retained as a monument to its significance.

Science campus

An aggressive building campaign on campus has resulted in a westward expansion of the main academic campus of Murray State. The expansion began with a massive renovation and expansion of what is now known as Alexander Hall on the west side of 16th Street near Calloway Avenue. The project was the first to unveil a new architectural style that would become consistent through all renovation and new construction projects on campus. Alexander Hall houses classrooms and offices for the College of Education. Construction continued with the new state-of-the-art science complex for biology and chemistry that is located just to the southwest of Alexander Hall. The massive new science complex was constructed in phases, with the Biology Building opening in 2004, and the rest of the complex and centerpiece clock tower reaching final completion in March 2008. The new clock tower was dedicated in 2007 as the Jesse L. Jones Family Clock Tower. A physics and engineering building was completed in summer 2017. The building cost roughly $37 million and serves as the final implementation of the MSU Gene W. Ray science campus.

Sports and recreation facilities

The majority of the university's sports and recreation facilities are located on the northernmost edge of the campus, along the KY-121 Bypass. The most prominent structure in the sports complex is Roy Stewart Stadium. The stadium, home field to the Murray State Racers football program, was completed in 1973 and named for former Murray State football coach Roy Stewart. It seats 16,800. The outdated AstroTurf surface was replaced with FieldTurf in 2007. Located on the second floor of the seven-story press box and seating structure is the Pat Spurgin Rifle Range, home of the three-time NCAA champion rifle squad. The 8,602-seat CFSB Center was completed in 1998 to replace the aging Racer Arena, which had been outgrown by the men's and women's basketball teams. Racer Arena remains in use by the women's volleyball team.

On April 16, 2005, the new Susan E. Bauernfeind Student Recreation and Wellness Center was dedicated. The  student recreation center includes a swimming pool, two racquetball courts, a walking/jogging track, an aerobic studio, basketball courts, and free weights and cardio workout machines. The center is located just north of the residential colleges, near Roy Stewart Stadium.

Residence halls
A building campaign is underway to replace many of the older residence halls. A replacement building for Clark College was completed and ready for residents at the beginning of the 2007 fall semester. Clark Hall was the newest building, and the first residence hall specifically designed around the residential college concept and model. A new four-story, 270-bed, 79,900-square foot Richmond Hall was opened for James H. Richmond Residential College in fall 2009. It has a similar concept and design as Clark College. In fall 2009, the old Clark Hall building was torn down.

Following the completion of the spring 2011 semester, the university began renovation to Elizabeth Hall, which houses the Elizabeth Residential College. The $7.2 million renovation project closed the building for the entire 2011–12 academic year as the highrise was upgraded to meet Americans with Disabilities Act (ADA) standards. The renovation also included new heating, ventilation, and air-conditioning systems with the goal of achieving Leadership in Energy and Environmental Design (LEED) silver status. The renovated Elizabeth Hall reopened on August 18, 2012. Hester Hall is the next highrise residence hall scheduled for renovation; however, the timeline for that project has not been announced.

Academics
Murray State University offers 11 associate, 64 bachelor, 42 master and specialist, and three doctoral programs which are administered through four academic colleges, two schools, 30 departments, and one joint program shared by the college of business and the college of science, engineering and technology. The college of business is the largest at Murray State, enrolling 23% of the undergraduate students.

Murray State has been institutionally accredited by the Southern Association of Colleges and Schools, Commission on Colleges, continuously since 1928. It is one of eight schools in the state of Kentucky to achieve AACSB accreditation of business programs; however, the school is not AACSB-accredited in accounting programs. Several other programs have achieved specialized accreditation: primarily programs in teaching, fine arts and nursing. As a former normal school and teachers college, Murray State is best known for its NCATE-accredited education programs. The Clinical Psychology Master's program is accredited by the Masters in Psychology and Counseling Accreditation Council (MPCAC). The university has also gained national recognition for its fine arts programs. The department of music has been a member of the National Association of Schools of Music since 1936.

Rankings
For 29 straight years Murray State University has been recognized by U.S. News & World Report's Best Colleges as one of the top regional universities in the United States. The 2019 rankings listed Murray State at 11th place among the public regional universities in the South and 24th overall among all regional universities in the South. Murray State has consistently been one of the top-ranked public regional universities in Kentucky in the Regional Universities-South category, which consists of both private and public schools. Murray State has also been ranked by Forbes among America's Top Colleges since 2008.

Tuition policies
Presumably due to its location near multiple state borders, Murray State offers discounts from its normal out-of-state tuition rates to residents of several regional states. These discounts apply only to residential students; all online students pay the same rate regardless of residency. Tuition for doctoral students also does not vary by state of residence.
 Residents of Alabama, Arkansas, Illinois, Indiana, Missouri, and Mississippi receive what Murray State calls a "regional" rate for both undergraduate and graduate programs.
 Residents of Tennessee receive the regional rate for graduate programs, but for undergraduate programs receive a special rate between the regional and in-state rates.
 Residents of specific counties in Illinois, Indiana, and Tennessee are treated as Kentucky residents for tuition purposes:
 Illinois: Massac County (directly across the Ohio River from Paducah, the largest city in Murray State's home Purchase region)
 Indiana: Posey, Vanderburgh, and Warrick Counties (all directly across the Ohio from Kentucky; Evansville is in Vanderburgh County)
 Tennessee: Henry, Montgomery, Obion, Stewart, and Weakley Counties (all bordering Kentucky; Clarksville is in Montgomery County)

International students
401 international students from 45 countries studied at Murray State as of 2021. MSU has several international student groups, including the International Student Organization, the Saudi Student Association, and the Indian Student Association.

Murray State University provides an English as a Second Language (ESL) program to assist international students who are not fluent in English to come to Kentucky to study. This program provides English-speaking, listening, reading, and writing instruction while teaching students about American culture. The ESL program also offers conversation partner practice, where international students are paired with students from the United States to practice speaking English.

Campus life

Residential colleges

As of fall 2012, Murray State had 2,831 students living on campus. Murray State was the first public university in the United States to adopt a successful campus-wide residential college program. The residential college structure, which took form on the campus in 1996, is based on similar, but much more established programs at the Universities of Oxford and Cambridge in the United Kingdom as well as Yale University, Harvard College and Princeton University in the United States.

The Murray State model does not include some components of the classical residential college model, such as dining halls and libraries at each college. In the Murray State model students do share central dining areas and recreation areas. However, as the older structures are being phased out, the university is taking steps with the new residential colleges to address many of those needs.

Although the physical structures of all of Murray State's residential colleges do not match those of institutions such as Oxford or Yale, the basic residential college concept was successfully implemented. All faculty, staff and students, even those who live off-campus, are assigned to one of the eight residential colleges. Once assigned to a residential college, a person remains a member of that college throughout their time at the university.

The eight colleges of Murray State 
 Clark College, named for Lee Clark, who assisted Rainey T. Wells in founding the university. Clark later served as the superintendent of grounds and buildings. The current Clark College opened in August 2007 as the first new residence hall built on campus since 1970. It is also the first residence hall at Murray to be specifically designed to support the residential college concept.
 Elizabeth College, named for Elizabeth Harkless Woods, wife of fourth Murray State President Ralph H. Woods
 Hart College, named for George Hart, a Board of Regents member and former mayor of Murray
 Hester College, named for Cleo Gillis Hester, who served Murray State University from 1927 to 1960, as registrar
 Regents College, named in honor of the outstanding citizens who have served on Murray State University's Board of Regents; completed in 1970
 Richmond College, named for the third president of the university, James H. Richmond
 Springer-Franklin College, named for O.B. Springer, member of the Board of Regents from 1950 to 1958 and 1960 to 1970, and Hollis C. Franklin, who served on the board from 1947 to 1956
 White College, named for R.H. "Bob" White, a Board of Regents member

Student Government Association
The Student Government Association (SGA) is the officially organized body governing all students and student organizations at Murray State University. Its purpose is to promote the welfare, growth and development of student life in an environment of academic excellence, to represent the students in all phases of administrative effort and to provide a means of promoting cooperative efforts for the general welfare of the university community. The SGA is made up four branches: Senate, Campus Activities Board, Judicial Board and the Residential College Association. The Senate is the main branch of SGA, and it is the governing body with the power to pass resolutions, bills, rules and regulations necessary for the general welfare of the university, and to implement and maintain any programs consistent with SGA purposes. The president of SGA holds the student seat on the Board of Regents.

Greek life
Murray State is home to twenty-six chapters of both social and professional Greek organizations. The oldest social fraternity on campus is Phi Mu Alpha Sinfonia and the oldest professional fraternity is Sigma Alpha Iota (both relating to music) with the oldest social sorority being Sigma Sigma Sigma. As of the spring 2016 semester, 1,438 students were officially reported to be involved with Greek life, representing 19 percent of the undergraduate student population. This number would be higher, but the Office of Greek Life does not track participation in several Greek organizations that have a professional emphasis.

According to the Office of Greek Life at Murray State University's website, the mission of the Office of Greek Life at Murray State University is to promote an atmosphere where chapters and individuals can excel in leadership, scholarship, service and philanthropy and personal growth. In support of the University and Student Affairs Mission Statements, they are committed to Murray State University students in the fulfillment of the following core values: leadership, scholarship, service and philanthropy and social advancement. 
Sorority and Fraternity primary recruitment at Murray State University takes place annually during the month of August. Spring recruitment is in-formal and often happens in late January. 

As of Fall 2019, 16% of undergraduate students make up Murray State Greek Life. The average chapter size for the Panhellenic Council is 93; Interfraternity Council is 50; and National Pan-Hellenic Council is 5. The average Greek GPA is 3.20. (All statistics come from Murray State University Office of Greek Life website.)

Among inactive chapters, Delta Sigma Phi, Sigma Nu, and Sigma Tau Gamma have approached the Office of Greek Life & Student Leadership Programs about restarting their chapters through expansion efforts; however, such an expansion has not yet taken place. A student-led effort to restart Tau Kappa Epsilon without national-level support resulted in a colony forming in 2006; however, the effort never generated the required membership and the colony was closed in 2012 without re-chartering. In March 2013, Murray State announced that Kappa Delta was selected to restart its chapter through an expansion effort that would begin in fall 2013.  Kappa Delta's chapter was officially reinstalled on October 27, 2013. Delta Zeta was also approved to begin an expansion to Murray State in fall 2016, and Phi Mu was approved to expand to the campus between fall 2018 and fall 2020.

The Greek community also featured a local sorority from 1988 to 1994. Theta Chi Delta sorority was a member of MSU's Panhellenic Council and participated in most campus events. In 1994 the sorority became a colony of Phi Sigma Sigma but the colonization was unsuccessful and the organization folded in 1995.

In 2022, Murray State University announced a campaign to raise funds in support of the construction of a new plaza dedicated to the NPHC, National Pan-Hellenic Council, at the campus. The plaza includes nine columns representing the various organization's letters and crest. The purpose of this project is to educate the community of each organization's mission to promote "unanimity." The plaza reminds community members and campus overall as a symbol of welcome, hope and pride. 
The "divine nine" NPHC organizations at Murray State University that will be represented at the plaza: Alpha Phi Alpha fraternity, Alpha Kappa Alpha sorority, Kappa Alpha Psi fraternity, Omega Psi Phi fraternity, Delta Sigma Theta sorority, Phi Beta Sigma fraternity, Zeta Phi Beta sorority, Sigma Gamma Rho sorority , and Iota Phi Theta fraternity.

Traditions

Alma mater
The alma mater of Murray State University is sung to the tune of "Annie Lisle" and has two verses. A.B. Austin, onetime Dean of Men, wrote the words in 1935. It is traditionally sung at student orientation, convocation and commencement ceremonies, athletic events and other special events on campus.

All-Campus Sing
All-Campus Sing is an annual event, first held in 1958, that takes place each April in which residential colleges, fraternities, sororities and other student organizations compete in a choreographed song and dance competition. The event is hosted by the Iota Beta chapter of Sigma Alpha Iota (the original organizer of the event), with financial assistance from the MSU Alumni Association and the office of student affairs. It is held on the steps of historic Lovett Auditorium.

Campus Lights
Campus Lights is the longest running student produced and performed musical in the South. The show was started in 1938 by the Gamma Delta chapter of Phi Mu Alpha as a fundraiser to pay the chapter's chartering fees. Campus Lights is now produced by a joint effort of the Gamma Delta chapter of Phi Mu Alpha and the Iota Beta chapter of Sigma Alpha Iota. All proceeds from the show are given to the department of music in order to fund scholarships.

Racer One
In 1976, the tradition of having a thoroughbred run around the track after every MSU football touchdown began. The name of that first racehorse was Violet Cactus. She died in 1984, and was buried at Roy Stewart Stadium, near the area where the current Racer One begins its run around the football field after a Racer touchdown. She is the only mascot to be interred inside the walls of the stadium. Since 1985, each horse that has circled the football field after touchdowns has been known as Racer One. Several horses have filled the role of Racer One since 1985, and the position is currently held by a horse named Vegas. Each fall, sophomores and juniors with riding experience can try out to serve as jockey of Racer One for the following football season. The position is typically held by a student in his or her senior year.

Shoe Tree

Located in front of Pogue Library, Murray State tradition dictates if a couple gets married after meeting at Murray State, they return to the Quad and each one nails one of their shoes to the "Shoe Tree." Many of the shoes include names and dates written on them. If the couple has a baby, the baby's shoes are sometimes also nailed to the tree. The shoe tree tradition originated around 1965. This tree (due to a high zinc content from the nails) is a common target of lightning and has caught fire in the past. Previous incarnations of the Shoe Tree were removed in 1999 and 2015 due to safety reasons; the tradition continues through the third tree. The Shoe Tree was featured in Danish pop band Lukas Graham's September 2018 music video for their song "Love Someone."

Tent City
An annual tradition since 1989, Tent City is an event that takes place before every homecoming football game. At Tent City, more than 50 tents are set up on the track at Roy Stewart Stadium, representing fraternities, sororities, student organizations, and residential colleges. An average of 100 organizations participate each year. Students use this event as a chance to talk to and meet with alumni to help raise money for their activities throughout the school year.

Athletics

The Murray State athletic teams are called the Racers. Their historic nickname had been the "Thoroughbreds", but all teams changed over time to "Racers", with the last holdout of baseball making the change in 2014. The university is a member of the NCAA Division I ranks (for football, the Football Championship Subdivision), primarily competing in the Missouri Valley Conference (MVC) since the 2022–23 academic year. The Racers previously competed in the Ohio Valley Conference (OVC) from 1948–49 to 2021–22; and in the Kentucky Intercollegiate Athletic Conference (KIAC; now currently known as the River States Conference (RSC) since the 2016–17 school year) of the National Association of Intercollegiate Athletics (NAIA) from 1933–34 to 1947–48.

Murray State competes in 15 intercollegiate varsity sports: Men's sports include baseball, basketball, cross country, football and golf; while women's sports include basketball, cross country, golf, soccer, softball, tennis, track & field and volleyball; and co-ed sports include rifle.

Move to the MVC
In July 2022, Murray State and Belmont will both leave the OVC to join the MVC. Because the MVC does not sponsor football, Murray State plans to remain in OVC football for the 2022 season before leaving for the Missouri Valley Football Conference (a separate entity from the MVC) in 2023. MSU will also maintain OVC membership in rifle, another sport not sponsored by the MVC.

Accomplishments
Murray State is particularly renowned for its men's basketball program, which has made 18 appearances in the NCAA Tournament, most recently in 2022. In 2010, as a 13-seed, Murray State won their second ever NCAA tournament game on a buzzer beater against 4th-seeded Vanderbilt. Former Alabama head basketball coach Mark Gottfried coached the Racers to three Ohio Valley Conference Championships all three years he coached there, the only OVC coach to accomplish such a mark. The Racer men's basketball team was also led to the 2012 OVC championship by Coach Steve Prohm. The basketball program has been recognized as one of the top 30 basketball programs in modern history by ESPN.

Murray State also is home to one of the nation's top rifle programs. The Racers claimed national championships in 1978 (NRA), 1985 (NCAA) and 1987 (NCAA) and have produced six individual NCAA national champions, including two-time national titlist and 1984 Summer Olympics gold medalist Pat Spurgin.

The football program has become a stepping-stone to major college-coaching success. Frank Beamer, the former Virginia Tech head coach who built that program into a national power in the 1990s and early 2000s, and former Ole Miss head coach Houston Nutt are both former Racers head coaches. Former Maryland head coach Ralph Friedgen was a Racers assistant under Beamer, and former Illinois head coach Ron Zook was an assistant under former ESPN college football analyst Mike Gottfried, who was Beamer's predecessor as head coach.

Murray State is also the home of a nationally ranked collegiate bass fishing team which has won multiple titles, including national championships.

Publications

The Murray State News
The Murray State News is the student newspaper of Murray State University. The newspaper has been the recipient of several ACP Pacemaker awards, the highest award given to collegiate newspapers, most recently in 2004. In October 2013 the newspaper won third place best-in-show for four-year weekly broadcast at the National College Media Convention in New Orleans. The Murray State News gained notoriety between 1998 and 2001 through the work of cartoonist Darin Shock. Shock earned the honor of top college cartoonist in the nation from the College Media Advisers in 2000. He had earned second place honors the previous year.

Gateway 
Gateway Magazine is a full-color, glossy magazine published annually as an imprint of The Murray State News.

The Shield
The school yearbook, The Shield, was awarded three Pacemaker awards and two CSPA Silver Crowns. The Shield ceased publication with its 2008 edition due to financial concerns.

New Madrid
The university's national literary magazine, New Madrid with editor Ann Neelon, featured work from a range of nationally recognized authors, and received acclaim from sources as diverse as La Bloga, a leading Hispanic journal, and New Pages, a leading national review of literary magazines. A lack of funding led to suspension of publication in 2018.

Radio
WKMS-FM (91.3 FM) is a non-commercial, educational National Public Radio-affiliated station licensed and operated by Murray State University. It features a variety of NPR programming and local music shows ranging from classical music, bluegrass, alternative rock, jazz, electronica and world music.

Notable alumni

Arts and entertainment
 W. Earl Brown (BS '86), actor
 Jerry Crutchfield, country and pop record producer, songwriter, and musician
 Jude Deveraux, romance novelist
 S.G. Goodman, singer-songwriter
 Dustin Lee Howard (Class of 2011), independent professional wrestler "Chuck Taylor", also known as "Chuckie T"
 Alma Lesch (BA '41), fiber artist
 Mike Long (BS Physics), speech writer and author
 Hal Riddle (BS '42), actor
 Joe Staton (BS '70), comic book artist
 Chrishell Stause (BA '03), actress, best known for playing the role Amanda Dillon on All My Children
 Chris Thile, musician and host of American Public Media's Live From Here
 Richard Thomas (MFA '12), author, known for his neo-noir and speculative fiction 
 Jilon VanOver (BS '01), actor, best known for playing the role of Ransom Bray on Hatfields & McCoys
 Rodney Watson (BA ‘81), distinguished educator
 J.D. Wilkes (BA '96), musician, visual artist, filmmaker

Athletics
 Shane Andrus, placekicker for NFL's Indianapolis Colts, Tampa Bay Buccaneers and San Francisco 49ers
 Ivan Aska (born 1990), basketball player in the Israeli National League
 Leva Bates (born 1983), professional wrestler with All Elite Wrestling
 Marcus Brown, NBA player 1996–1999; retired as Euroleague all-time leading scorer
Shaq Buchanan (born 1997), basketball player in the Israeli Basketball Premier League
 Todd Buchanan, head coach of women's basketball at Houston 2010–2013
 Isaiah Canaan, professional basketball player (NBA player especially with the Houston Rockets, Philadelphia 76ers, Chicago Bulls and Phoenix Suns) and 2012 All-American
 Mike Cherry, NFL New York Giants quarterback 1997-2000
 Ed Daniel, basketball player for Israeli team Maccabi Ashdod
 Bud Foster, defensive coordinator of Virginia Tech football team
 Tony Franklin, offensive coordinator at Middle Tennessee, former OC for Auburn and University of California
 Justin Fuente, former head football coach of the Virginia Tech Hokies, former head football coach of the Memphis Tigers, former offensive coordinator for the TCU Horned Frogs
 Joe Fulks, Basketball Hall of Famer and early pioneer of jump shot (did not graduate; left to join Marines during World War II)
 Ron Greene, former head basketball coach of Mississippi State and Murray State
 Pete Gudauskas, NFL player, Chicago Bears
 Rod Harper, Super Bowl champion wide receiver for New Orleans Saints
 Rob Hart, placekicker for NFL's, Tampa Bay Buccaneers, New Orleans Saints and the Miami Dolphins; known for kicking barefoot
 Morgan Hicks, competitor at 2004 Summer Olympics in three-position smallbore shooting, 2008 ISSF World Cup rifle champion, and head coach of Nebraska Cornhuskers Rifle
 Ron Hopkins, Canadian Football League player
 Ronald "Popeye" Jones, NBA player 1993–2005
 Wesley Korir, Kenyan marathoner, winner of the 2012 Boston Marathon, and Kenyan Member of Parliament 2011–2016, transferred to the University of Louisville after Murray State dropped its men's track program
 Austen Lane, defensive end for Chicago Bears, Jacksonville Jaguars
 Gil Mains, NFL football player, Detroit Lions
 Jeff Martin, professional basketball player
 Ja Morant, NBA player with the Memphis Grizzlies
 Patrick Newcomb, professional golfer on the Web.com Tour
 Cameron Payne, NBA player with the Phoenix Suns, Oklahoma City Thunder, Chicago Bulls, and Cleveland Cavaliers
 Walt Powell, professional football player
 Michael Proctor, CFL football player
 Bennie Purcell, basketball and Harlem Globetrotters player, MSU tennis coach
 Johnny Reagan, minor league baseball player and college baseball coach
 Mark Riggins, pitching coach for Chicago Cubs, Cincinnati Reds
 Kirk Rueter, Major League Baseball pitcher for Montreal Expos (1993–96) and San Francisco Giants (1996–2005)
 Heather Samuel, track and field, three-time Olympian (1992, 1996, 2000)
 James Singleton, professional basketball player
 Pat Spurgin, eight-time All-America, 1984 Summer Olympics gold medalist in rifle
 Reggie Swinton, NFL football player, Detroit Lions, Dallas Cowboys
 Chuck Taylor, professional wrestler
 Claude Virden, American Basketball Association player
 Quincy Williams, NFL player with the Jacksonville Jaguars
 Roger Withrow, rifle gold medalist at 1984 Summer Paralympics
 Jared Wolfe, professional golfer on the Web.com Tour

Business and industry
 Rex Geveden ('83, MS '84), CEO of BWX Technologies, a Fortune 1000 company based in Lynchburg, Virginia

Government, law and military
 Bill Bailey (BS '70), former member of the Indiana House of Representatives and former mayor of Seymour, Indiana
 Rex Geveden (MS '84), former Associate Administrator of NASA
 Melvin Henley ('61, '64, '90), former member of the Kentucky State House of Representatives
 Stanley H. Humphries ('92), former member of the Kentucky State Senate
 Bob Jackson ('85), former member of the Kentucky State Senate
 Steven Rudy (BS '00), Majority Floor Leader of the Kentucky House of Representatives
 Harry Lee Waterfield ('32), two-time Democratic Lieutenant Governor of Kentucky
 Kenneth W. Winters (BS '57), former member of the Kentucky State Senate

Journalism
 Taghreed El-Khodary (MS '00), New York Times correspondent in Gaza

Medicine
 Jerry A. Shields, ('60), ophthalmologist, ocular oncology, Wills Eye Institute, Philadelphia

References

External links
 
 Murray State athletics website
 

 
Public universities and colleges in Kentucky
Educational institutions established in 1922
Buildings and structures in Calloway County, Kentucky
Universities and colleges accredited by the Southern Association of Colleges and Schools
Education in Calloway County, Kentucky
1922 establishments in Kentucky
Murray, Kentucky